SFF can refer to:

Computing
 Small form factor (desktop and motherboard), a term covering smaller-than traditional form factors for computer components
 Standard flowgram format, a file generated by a 454 sequencing machine

Events 
 Sarajevo Film Festival, a premier annual film festival in the Balkans
 Singapore Fireworks Festival
 Sydney Film Festival

Military
 Special Field Force, a Namibian paramilitary police unit
 Special Frontier Force, an Indian paramilitary special force

Organizations and enterprises
 The NYSE stock symbol for Santa Fe Energy
 Science Festival Foundation
 Shooters, Fishers and Farmers Party, an Australian political party
 Small Form Factor Committee, a computer industry standards organization that creates standards for computer data storage systems (not related to SFF motherboards and cases)
 Small Form Factor Special Interest Group, a computer industry standards organization that maintains standards for SFF motherboards and cases
 Space Frontier Foundation, a space advocacy non-profit organization

Sports
 Seychelles Football Federation
 Somali Football Federation
 Split-finger fastball, a pitch in baseball

Other uses

 Felts Field (IATA: SFF), a public airport near Spokane, Washington
 Safe failure fraction
 Self forging fragment (see explosively formed penetrator), a type of shaped charge
 SF&F, an acronym for science fiction and fantasy
 Solid freeform fabrication
 Spiritual Frontiers Fellowship
 Subito fortissimo, a dynamic marking in music

See also 
 Small form factor (disambiguation)